Malé Kosihy is a village and municipality in the Nové Zámky District in the Nitra Region of south-west Slovakia.

Etymology
The name Kosihy is derived from the name of old Magyar tribe Keszi guarding the area.

History
In historical records the village was first mentioned in 1248 (Keseu).

Geography
The village lies at an altitude of 115 metres and covers an area of 8.432 km². It has a population of about 382 people.

Ethnicity
The population is about 98% Hungarian and 2% Slovak.

Facilities
The village has a public library and a football pitch.

References

External links
https://web.archive.org/web/20070513023228/http://www.statistics.sk/mosmis/eng/run.html
Malé Kosihy – Nové Zámky Okolie

Villages and municipalities in Nové Zámky District